History, Mystery is the 20th album by Bill Frisell to be released on the Elektra Nonesuch label. It was released in 2008.

Reception
The Allmusic review by Thom Jurek awarded the album 4½ stars, stating, "Frisell's inherent love of formal lyricism, expansive harmonics, and divergent musical histories reflects his tireless passion for tracing sources. In composing his own material, he also interprets and arranges his sources. On History, Mystery he achieves musical alchemy; he creates something new from familiar, exotic, and even forgotten forms, providing listeners with a magical aural experience".

Track listing
All compositions by Bill Frisell except as indicated.

Disc 1
 "Imagination" – 1:51
 "Probability Cloud" – 4:45
 "Probability Cloud Part 2" – 1:01 
 "Out of Body" – 2:27 
 "Struggle" – 5:32
 "A Momentary Suspension of Doubt" – 0:38
 "Onward" – 1:38
 "Baba Drame" (Boubacar Traoré) – 6:09
 "What We Need" – 1:37
 "A Change Is Gonna Come" (Sam Cooke) – 8:49
 "Jackie-ing" (Thelonious Monk) – 2:55
 "Show Me" – 3:16
 "Boo and Scout" – 2:28
 "Struggle Part 2" – 6:25
 "Heal" – 1:41
 "Another Momentary Suspension of Doubt" – 0:37
 "Probability Cloud (Reprise)" – 1:36

Disc 2
 "Monroe" – 4:18
 "Lazy Robinson" – 2:18
 "Question #1" – 1:14
 "Answer #1" – 0:40
 "Faces" – 1:52
 "Sub-Conscious Lee" (Lee Konitz) – 5:39
 "Monroe Part 2" – 1:52
 "Question #2" – 0:56
 "Lazy Robinson Part 2" – 3:18
 "What We Need Part 2" – 1:16
 "Waltz for Baltimore" – 8:47
 "Answer #2" – 1:50
 "Monroe Part 3" – 2:58

Personnel
Bill Frisell – guitars
Ron Miles – cornet
Greg Tardy – tenor saxophone, clarinet
Jenny Scheinman – violin
Eyvind Kang – viola
Hank Roberts – cello
Tony Scherr – bass
Kenny Wollesen – drums

References 

2008 albums
Bill Frisell albums
Nonesuch Records albums